Calliergon richardsonii, Richardson's calliergon moss, is a species of moss belonging to the family Amblystegiaceae.

It has almost cosmopolitan distribution.

References

Hypnales